Footing may refer to:

A type of foundation, in architecture and civil engineering
Footing (bookkeeping)
Footing (sexual act)
Jogging, a form of running

See also
Footer (disambiguation)